The Nitro World Games is an annual extreme sports event organized by Nitro Circus. The event was originally held in 2016 at Rice–Eccles Stadium, and moved to the Utah Motorsports Campus in 2018.

History
In December 2015, Nitro Circus CEO Michael Porra and Travis Pastrana announced the creation of the Nitro World Games, with the inaugural Games scheduled for summer 2016 at Rice–Eccles Stadium in Salt Lake City. The city was selected for its history with the 2002 Winter Olympics and Nitro Circus. The Nitro World Games 2016 were held on July 16 with seven gold medal events.

The 2018 edition was moved to Utah Motorsports Campus in Erda. Rallycross and FMX Quarterpipe were added, with the former competing on a track designed by Pastrana. BMX and skateboarding events were conducted at the CA Training Facility in Vista, California, while scooter competitions were held at Adrenaline Alley in Corby, United Kingdom (ScootFest) and Paris, France (Scooter Best Trick).

The 2020 edition was set to be held at the Principality Stadium in Cardiff, Wales. However, it was canceled because of the COVID-19 pandemic.

Host venues

Hot Wheels Nitro Junior Games

2019 in ??
2021 in United States, Chino, California

Results

Winners

 BMX

 Inline skating

 Motocross

 Scooter

 Skateboard

 Racing

Medal count by country

References

External links
 

Multi-sport events
Recurring sporting events established in 2015
Skateboarding competitions
BMX competitions
Freestyle motocross
Annual sporting events in the United States
2015 establishments in Utah
Sports competitions in Salt Lake City
Tooele County, Utah